Rosalia is a feminine given name of Latin origin meaning "rose" and was the name of an early saint Saint Rosalia. In Latin, the Rosalia was a festival of roses celebrated variously throughout the Roman Empire.

Variants
Rosalia or Lia (Italian)
Rosália (Portuguese)
Rosalía (Galician and Spanish)
Rosalia or Lia (Catalan)
Rosalie (French)
Rozália (Hungarian)
Rozalija (Latvian, Lithuanian, Slovene and Croatian)
Zala (Slovene)

Notable people
 Rosalía Arteaga (born 1956), Ecuadorian politician
 Rosalia Lombardo (1918–1920), Italian child famous for her well-preserved mummy
 Rosalía Mera (1944–2013), Spanish billionaire businesswoman
 Rosalia Price (fl. 1790), British circus artist
 Rosalía de Castro (1837–1885), Spanish romanticist writer
 Rosalía (singer) (born 1992), Spanish singer
 Saint Rosalia, patron saint of Palermo in Italy

Notes

Given names derived from plants or flowers
Italian feminine given names
Spanish feminine given names